The Union Bank Building is a skyscraper in Winnipeg, Canada.

Union Bank Building may also refer to:

 Union Bank Building (Lagos), Nigeria
 Union Bank, Fremantle, Australia
 Union Bank of Australia building, Orange, NSW, Australia
 Union Bank Tower, Portland, Oregon, USA